St John the Baptist Cathedral, Murray Bridge is the cathedral church of the Anglican Diocese of The Murray, greater Adelaide,  South Australia.

The cathedral building was built in 1887 of rough stone as a parish church and, with a maximum seating capacity of 130, is the smallest cathedral in Australia.

The interior of the cathedral is decorated in the High Church tradition.

See also
Church of Holy Cross, Nin Croatia
Cathedral of The Isles Scotland

References

Anglican cathedrals in Australia
Cathedrals in South Australia
20th-century Anglican church buildings
Churches completed in 1887
20th-century churches in Australia